The Queen Bess is a grade-II-listed public house in Scunthorpe, Lincolnshire, England. It opened in 1959 and is one of the few remaining examples of postwar pubs that have not been altered, closed down or demolished.

Location
The pub is on Derwent Road, in the southeast of the town, close to the British Steel Corporation Scunthorpe Steelworks.

History
Designed by local architects Wilburn and Son, the pub was built by the Samuel Smith Old Brewery—who remain the owners—and opened on 18 December 1959. It was named after a similarly titled blast furnace at the nearby Appleby-Frodingham steelworks, which had opened in 1950 and was at that point part of the biggest steelworks in Britain. The sign outside the pub features a picture of Queen Elizabeth I on one side, and a picture of a blast furnace on the other. It quickly became a focal point of the local area.

Architecture
The premises has been largely unaltered since its construction. It was Grade-II-listed in 2018, as one of five postwar pubs—and the second in Scunthorpe—to be awarded this status. It features a brick exterior and a plain tile roof, which was designed to be compatible with new local housing developments.

The National Heritage List for England consider the pub to be one of the best examples of post–World War II 20th-century pub architecture, and notes that many pubs of a similar age have been closed or demolished. Most of the interior fittings date from the original opening, including bar counters, fixed seating, furniture and doors.

References

External links 
 

Buildings and structures completed in 1959
Grade II listed pubs in Lincolnshire
Grade II listed buildings in North Lincolnshire
Buildings and structures in Scunthorpe